Palais Royal is French for "Royal Palace", and can refer to the Palais-Royal, a former royal palace in Paris

Palais Royal may also refer to:
 Palais Royal (Houston-based department store), a chain of department stores in the United States
 Palais Royal (Washington, D.C.), a department store operating from the 1870s-1940s
 Palais Royale, a dance hall in Toronto, Canada
 Palais Royale, Mumbai, a skyscraper in Mumbai, India
 Palaye Royale, a rock band
 Palais Royale Building, a historic commercial building in South Bend, Indiana

See also 
 List of royal palaces
 Royal Palace (disambiguation)
 Palais (disambiguation)
 Royal (disambiguation)